CarWings, renamed NissanConnect in 2015, and also branded as Infiniti InTouch is a vehicle telematics service offered by the Nissan Motor Company to drivers in Japan, the United States, Canada, Great Britain, and most other countries where the LEAF is sold. It provides mobile connectivity for on-demand traffic information services and internet provided maps displayed inside select Nissan vehicles. The service began in December 1997, having been installed in the 1997 Nissan Cedric, Nissan Gloria, Nissan President, Nissan Cima and the Nissan Elgrand.

The subscription service replaces the need to periodically update in-car navigation systems that use CD, or DVD installed maps that must be updated with the latest information. The maps are sent by internet connections established through the vehicles TCU (telematics control unit), unlike other Nissan vehicles that use the driver's cell phone to connect to their data services.

Vehicles installed with the service
Starting October 2006

 Presage
 Skyline
 Stagea
 Sylphy
 Teana
 Wingroad
 Murano
 Serena
 Lafesta
 Note
 Fuga
 Tiida
 Latio
 Leaf
 Elgrand
 Dualis

Services Offered
The services offered vary on the version of the navigation system installed in the vehicle.

Fastest route (on-demand VICS) 
This feature offers the most efficient route based on various conditions between the point of departure and the destination. The objective of this feature is to offer a predetermined route that will enable the driver to arrive with the fewest interruptions, taking into account any factors that could contribute to a delay in arriving in the least amount of driving time. The VICS (Vehicle Information and Communication System) feature is a service offered only in Japan that provides traffic information and is broadcast digitally on FM radio frequencies.

Operator Services
By selecting this feature, the system will connect you to a call center, where a destination can be sent to your vehicle by an operator, which can be done while the vehicle is moving. Other information available includes current weather information, a search for restaurants as well as other features. If the caller is unsure of some of the details needed, the live operator can make suggestions or offer assistance in numerous categories.

AutoDJ (information content) 
Some of the services available include traffic and weather information, horoscopes, including sports scores and game status. The information is then displayed on the screen. The downloaded text, and navigation can be read audibly by the navigation system. Starting September 20, 2006, CARWINGS was made available to subscribers on their home computers, by registering the URL of a site that offers RSS, which is then relayed to a separate "information channel" that is also displayed.

Probe traffic information delivery
Installed in conjunction with HDD navigation, this service began in November 2006. The telemetry is uploaded via mobile phones, and the Nissan Vehicle Information Center collects and analyzes statistical system to deliver results as traffic information. The vehicles position is then complemented by the VICS service to display the fastest route. The implementation is very similar to the "Floating car" system offered by Honda's Internavi service.
As of June 2007, the vehicles listed below were offered this particular service.
Skyline, Serena, Tiida, Tiida Latio, Wingroad, Dualis

This city guide
Installed in HDD navigation, and Service began in November 2006. 
This service offers entertainment, shopping and leisure activities available relative to the current vehicles position and is downloaded automatically. It offers voice suggestions and directions to various locations.

Random Play
Installed in HDD navigation, and Service began in November 2006.
Provide location and time automatically according to the above services listed.

Price
When a new car is purchased at Japanese Nissan dealers, the navigation service is optional, registration for the service was free for three years from April 2008 operator services are free. After the free period ends, the service is available for ¥ 3,150 per year. The data connection subscription is an additional fee, provided by mobile phone communication services from telecom company WILLCOM subscription service "dedicated service for CARWINGS Navigation System". Softbank in 2010 since January, and flat-rate only communicate with the car navigation system at 210 yen per month to charge regular packets "Navigation Plan".

Supported vehicles
Most of the Nissan vehicles (excluding commercial vehicles, some trucks) manufacturers standard or available in the navigation support options that are set by dealers. However, the feature can be used by different types of cars and navigation. Also, Suzuki for certain models (Grand Vitara etc.) have also been adopted.

Since September 2008, Sanyo navigation system also added support in some models of their "Gorilla" product line.

Chronology
 December 1997 - Telematics Service Provider "Compass Link Co., Ltd." was established
 September 1998 - telematics services manned by operators, "Compass Link" Launched
 July 1999 - No Information Service "Auto Compass Link" service start
 January 2000 - Compass Link Service Mitsubishi provided for the start
 July 2000 - BMW JAPAN link service as a compass for the "BMW Asist mobility support" start service.
 February 2002 - Leveraging the experience and expertise in linking compass, the nation's first comprehensive telematics services "CARWINGS (Wings Car)" was released
 February 2002 - Corporation TBS Radio & Communications in collaboration with the "Car Wings" on-demand start joint experiments utilizing radio
 April 2003 - Japan Railway Co. "Automotive Engineering" New Technology of the Year award for 2002-2003
 September 2004 - the fastest route search function, Bluetooth released a new CARWINGS navigation with wireless communications
 October 2004 - or 24-hour operator service CARWINGS, free for three years in the service fee structure to suit
 October 2004 - NTT DoCoMo as a joint review services, and new information services, "Mobile and Send" Start
 May 2005 - Sites that offer car Wings Plan "drive" the world's first commercial route search function using statistical traffic information
 October 2005 - membership and community sites "Car Wings Style" begins (ended November 20, 2006)
 October 2005 - sponsored by Shogakukan "Grand Serai" Award winning service planning
 November 2006 - Launch of the HDD navigation type (probe traffic information distribution service started)
 January 23, 2008 - Willcom, but only began selling communication unit. This is achieved by a fixed amount of communication and service operators
 April 1, 2008 - or all services other than operator services for free (only for new car registration)
 September 19, 2008 - Sanyo made portable navigation NV-BD600DT (nickname: Gorilla) installed
 September 29, 2015 - CARWINGS is merged into the NissanConnect EV system
 February 2016 - The NissanConnect EV mobile app is disabled in response to the discovery of an exploit that could allow a hacker to remotely control certain non-critical systems such as climate control

See also

MyFord Touch
Ford Sync
Microsoft Auto
Bluetooth
OnStar
Hyundai Blue Link
Kia UVO
Toyota Entune (North America)
Toyota G-Book (Japan)
Honda's Internavi
BMW Assist
Fiat Blue&Me
MSN Direct
Mercedes COMAND
OVMS

References

External links
 Nissan CarWings Blog (Japanese)
 Nissan CarWings Main Page (Japanese)

Vehicle technology
Vehicle telematics
Automotive technology tradenames
Wireless
Nissan
Information systems
Warning systems
Road transport in Japan
Intelligent transportation systems
Telecommunications-related introductions in 1997
Audiovisual introductions in 1997
Japanese inventions
1997 establishments in Japan